José Damián Ortiz de Castro (1750–1793) was an 18th-century Novohispanic architect who carried out many construction works in Mexico City, such as the towers of the Mexico City Metropolitan Cathedral.

References

1750 births
1793 deaths
Mexican architects
Neoclassical architects